Upper Columbia Academy (UCA) is a 9-12 boarding high school located in Spangle, Washington, about 20 miles (32 km) south of Spokane. It is owned and operated by the Seventh-day Adventist Church. It is a part of the Seventh-day Adventist education system, the world's second largest Christian school system.

History
Upper Columbia Academy's predecessor was Yakima Valley Academy. That original school closed in 1945 due to lack of space and physical plant problems - walls were held together by metal cables mounted on both sides of the rooms. The school had to find a bigger place and Pastor Mote was empowered by the church leadership to spend no more than $100,000 for a school. Pastor Mote came to the auction for the old poor farm in Spangle, but the minimum opening bid was over his limit. He told the auctioneer that he couldn't bid, so minimum opening bid was lowered to $100,000. Pastor Mote's was the only bid and the property was purchased, along with 15 hogs that they sold for $1500 to provide operating capital for the first year of school.

Athletics
Upper Columbia Academy has six varsity sports teams. Men's Soccer, women's volleyball, men's and woman's basketball, and men's and woman's golf. Men's soccer has experienced some success placing 4th at the 2017 Walla Walla University fall classic tournament, and finishing 2nd at the Union college invitational. In 2018, the soccer team made it to the championship game at Fall Classic and the 3rd place game at the Union College Invitational. The men's Basketball team has been consistently good, boasting a positive win to loss ratio. At the 2018 Walla Walla University friendship tournament, the men's basketball team took 1st, never going down at any point throughout the entire tournament. In Golf, both Blake Johnson and Evan Pierce made the 2018 state tournament.

Academics
Upper Columbia Academy graduated 82 seniors at the end of the 2005-2006 school year. About 275 students attended UCA in 2005-2006. During this notable school year, UCA won the prestigious Academy Award of Excellence for being the top high school in the United States out of some 100 full-program Adventist high schools (citation: http://www.alumniawards.com/awards-grants/academy-awards). The current enrollment (2009–10) is 265 with a senior class of about 90.

Spiritual aspects
All students take religion classes each year that they are enrolled. These classes cover topics in biblical history and Christian and denominational doctrines. Instructors in other disciplines also begin each class period with prayer or a short devotional thought, many which encourage student input. Weekly, the entire student body gathers together in the auditorium for an hour-long chapel service. Outside the classrooms there is year-round spiritually oriented programming that relies on student involvement.

Student life
Students at UCA have jobs, attend classes, and participate in community service. Elective classes from CAD to metalworking to desktop publishing are available, as well as extracurricular activities—snow skiing in winter, camping, town trips, banquets, drama club, science club, etc.

External support
Upper Columbia Academy is owned and operated by the Upper Columbia Conference of Seventh-day Adventists.

Students who attend UCA have access to scholarships from the UCA Foundation, a 501(c)3 non-profit organization founded for the benefit of providing financial support to students.

Accreditation
 The State of Washington
 The Northwest Association of Schools and Colleges
 Accrediting Association of Seventh-day Adventist Schools, Colleges, and Universities, Inc.

See also

 List of Seventh-day Adventist secondary schools
 Seventh-day Adventist education

References

External links
 

High schools in Spokane County, Washington
Private high schools in Washington (state)
Adventist secondary schools in the United States
1945 establishments in Washington (state)